Matthew Kiersted (born April 14, 1998) is an American professional ice hockey defenseman currently playing for the Charlotte Checkers in the American Hockey League (AHL) as a prospect to the Florida Panthers of the National Hockey League (NHL).

Early life
Kiersted was born on April 14, 1998, in Elk River, Minnesota, to parents Bob Kiersted and Candace Hartwig. He grew up as the middle child between brothers Mitch and Drew. His father was friends with former ice hockey player Mark Parrish, who convinced them to let their children play the sport. Kiersted graduated from Elk River High School in 2016.

Playing career

Amateur
While attending Elk River High School, Kiersted committed to play collegiate ice hockey for the  North Dakota Fighting Hawks men's ice hockey team. As a junior, he left Elk River to play for the Chicago Steel of the United States Hockey League (USHL).

Professional
As a free agent, Kiersted signed a two-year, entry-level contract with the Florida Panthers on April 1, 2021. He made his NHL debut two days later, in the Panthers' 5–2 win against the Columbus Blue Jackets.

Career statistics

Awards and honors

References

External links
 

1998 births
Living people
Charlotte Checkers (2010–) players
Chicago Steel players
Ice hockey players from Minnesota
Florida Panthers players
North Dakota Fighting Hawks men's ice hockey players
Undrafted National Hockey League players
AHCA Division I men's ice hockey All-Americans